Maxlab Cinemas and Entertainments is an Indian film distribution and production company established in 2009 by actor-producer Mohanlal, producer Antony Perumbavoor and industrialist K. C. Babu. Since then, it has distributed several films in Malayalam and other Indian languages. The company is a regular distributor of films produced by Aashirvad Cinemas.

Filmography

See also
Aashirvad Cinemas
Mohanlal
Antony Perumbavoor

References

Mohanlal
2009 establishments in Kerala
Mass media companies established in 2009
Companies based in Kochi
Film production companies of Kerala
Film production companies of India